Loreto High School is a coeducational Catholic high school in the Manchester suburb of Chorlton-cum-Hardy. It was the first IVBM (Loreto Sisters) school to be coeducational from the very beginning and the first Loreto secondary school in the area since Loreto College was reduced to a sixth form college during the 1970s.

History
Loreto High School was originally St Thomas Aquinas High School, formerly Marist High School, a girls' grammar school founded during the 1960s. Prior to the rebranding, St Thomas Aquinas had a poor reputation in the community. It came under the trusteeship of the Loreto Sisters and was renamed Loreto High School in 2007.

Academics
Since the renaming, the school's academic performance has improved. It was rated "outstanding" and "good" in all aspects at the 2010 Diocesan inspection report and has been commended by Ofsted for "good practice" in its teaching.

In March 2020, due to the COVID-19 pandemic in the United Kingdom, the school, along with all of the schools in the UK and abroad, was shut until further notice, leaving students into home learning. Due to their GCSEs being cancelled, the Year 11 students left the school three months earlier.

References

External links
School website
Profile on Catholic Education Service
St Thomas Aquinas RC High School

Secondary schools in Manchester
Catholic secondary schools in the Diocese of Salford
Voluntary aided schools in England
Chorlton
1960s establishments in England
Educational institutions established in the 1960s
2007 establishments in England
Educational institutions established in 2007